Mike Moncsek (born 8 August 1964 in Freiberg, Saxony) is a German politician for the Alternative for Germany (AfD) political party and has been a member of the German Bundestag, the federal parliament, since 2021.

Life and politics 

Moncsek was born 1964 in the East German town of Freiberg and was elected directly to the Bundestag in 2021. After graduating from polytechnic high school, he worked as a car mechanic and as a regional sales manager for the automotive industry. In the 2021 German federal election he won the direct mandate with 28.9% of the direct votes for the Chemnitzer Umland - Erzgebirgskreis II constituency. Before his election to the Bundestag, he had also served as district councillor in Central Saxony for the AfD. Moncsek lives in Oberschöna in the district of Central Saxony and is a member of its local council.

Other Positions
According to Moncsek, he joined the AfD in 2015 as a result of the refugee crisis in Germany due to negative personal experiences with refugees. He felt, that despite declining refugee numbers, there were too few controls at the borders. He "has no reservations against people coming here, but they have to be useful to the national product," Moncsek said in an interview with the Freie Presse. Moncsek intends to campaign in the Bundestag for the long-term preservation of the diesel engine and for the strengthening of small and medium-sized enterprises and individual tourism.

References

External links
 Website of Mike Moncsek
 Biography at the German Bundestag
 Mike Moncsek on abgeordnetenwatch.de
 Account of Mike Moncsek on twitter.com

Living people
1964 births
Alternative for Germany politicians
Members of the Bundestag 2021–2025
21st-century German politicians
People from Freiberg
Members of the Bundestag for Saxony